National Highway 548CC, commonly referred to as NH 548CC is a national highway in  India. It is a spur road of National Highway 48. NH-548CC traverses the state of Maharashtra in India.

Route 

Mehkar, Chikhali, Khamgaon.

Junctions  

  Terminal near Mehkar.
  Terminal near Khamgaon.

See also 

 List of National Highways in India
 List of National Highways in India by state

References

External links 

 NH 548CC on OpenStreetMap

National highways in India
National Highways in Maharashtra